Berry is a given name and a nickname. People named Berry include:

Given name
 Berry Angriawan (born 1991), Indonesian badminton player
 Berry Bickle (born 1959), Zimbabwean artist
 Berry Fleming (1899–1989), American novelist
 Berry Gordy (born 1929), American record executive and producer, songwriter, film producer and television producer, founder of the Motown record label
 Berry Johnston (born 1935), American poker player, 1986 world champion 
 Berry Kroeger (1912–1991), American film, television and stage actor
 Berry Sakharof (born 1957), Israeli rock musician 
 Berry Oakley (1948–1972), American bassist, one of the founding members of the Allman Brothers Band
 Berry van Peer (born 1996), Dutch darts player
 Berry Powel (born 1980), Dutch footballer

Nickname
 Berry Berenson (1948–2001), American photographer, actress and model
 Berry Brown (1927–2001), English football goalkeeper

Fictional characters
Berry Shirayuki, in the anime Tokyo Mew Mew
Berry, a rabbit in the American animated series Whisker Haven Tales with the Palace Pets
Berry, a female pink character in Foster's Home for Imaginary Friends

See also
 T. Berry Brazelton (1918–2018), American pediatrician, author, developer of the Neonatal Behavioral Assessment Scale, television host and syndicated columnist

English-language masculine given names
Lists of people by nickname